The West House is a historic house at 229 Beech Street in Helena-West Helena, Arkansas.  It is a -story wood-frame structure, built in 1900 for Mercer Elmer West by the Clem Brothers of St. Louis.  The house exhibits stylistic elements of both the Colonial Revival, which was growing in popularity, and Queen Anne, which was in decline.  It has a wide porch supported by Ionic columns, with a spindled balustrade.  The house's corners are quoined.  The main entry is flanked by slender columns supporting an architrave, and then by sidelight windows topped by a transom window.  A Palladian window stands to the right of the door, and a bay window with a center transom of colored glass stands to the left.

The house was listed on the National Register of Historic Places in 1983.

See also
National Register of Historic Places listings in Phillips County, Arkansas

References

Houses on the National Register of Historic Places in Arkansas
Colonial Revival architecture in Arkansas
Houses completed in 1900
Houses in Phillips County, Arkansas
National Register of Historic Places in Phillips County, Arkansas
Historic district contributing properties in Arkansas